The United Nations Human Rights Monitoring Mission in Ukraine (HRMMU) is a group of human rights monitors established in Ukraine in 2014 by the Secretary-General of the United Nations.

Creation and aims
The United Nations Human Rights Monitoring Mission in Ukraine was created in 2014 with the aim of monitoring and advocating for human rights in Ukraine, in particular in "looking for accountability" for the events of the Revolution of Dignity and in monitoring the parts of Donbas and Crimea occupied by Russian forces since the 2014 start of the war in Donbas and annexation of Crimea by the Russian Federation.

Leadership, methods and structure
HRMMU was led by Fiona Frazer in 2016 and by Matilda Bogner in March 2022. HRMMU had 57 staff in 2020 and 60 in March 2022.

HRMMU's monitoring is based on firsthand testimony from people claiming human rights violations. HRMMU also contacts security services about suspected violations.

Actions
In 2016, issues treated by HRMMU included the cases of five people who had apparently been held in secret prisons in Kharkiv by the Security Service of Ukraine (SBU) and legal advocacy for victims of human rights violations. , HRMMU had not obtained access to places of detention in the parts of Donbas occupied by Russian forces.

In December 2016, Frazer, the head of HRMMU at the time, stated that civil society support had played a significant role in helping internally displaced persons over the previous two and a half years.

On 30 March 2022, Michelle Bachelet, the UN High Commissioner for Human Rights, stated that the HRMMU had 60 human rights monitors present in Ukraine. HRMMU had recorded 24 "credible allegations" of Russian use of cluster munitions and 77 incidents of damage to medical facilities during the 2022 Russian invasion of Ukraine. Bachelet stated, "The massive destruction of civilian objects and the high number of civilian casualties strongly indicate that the fundamental principles of distinction, proportionality and precaution have not been sufficiently adhered to."

See also
 Independent International Commission of Inquiry on Ukraine
 OSCE Special Monitoring Mission to Ukraine

References

External links
UN Human Rights Monitoring Mission in Ukraine

Human rights in Ukraine
War crimes during the 2022 Russian invasion of Ukraine
United Nations Human Rights Council
Ukraine and the United Nations